The Girl with the Red Hair is a 1981 Dutch drama film directed by Ben Verbong. It is based on the biography of resistance fighter Hannie Schaft. It was entered into the 32nd Berlin International Film Festival.

Cast 

 Renée Soutendijk - Hannie Schaft
 Peter Tuinman - Hugo
 Loes Luca - An
 Johan Leysen - Frans
 Robert Delhez - Floor
 Ada Bouwman - Tinka
 Lineke Rijxman - Judith
 Maria de Booy - Moeder
 Henk Rigters - Vader
 Adrian Brine - SD-er
 Chris Lomme - Mevrouw de Ruyter
 Lou Landré - Otto Schaaf
 Jan Retèl - Professor
 Elsje Scherjon - Carlien

References

External links

1981 films
Dutch drama films
1980s Dutch-language films
1981 drama films
Films about Dutch resistance
Films directed by Ben Verbong
History of Haarlem